Ben Storey (born June 22, 1977) is a Canadian former professional ice hockey player.

Playing career
Storey was drafted 98th overall by the Colorado Avalanche in the 1996 NHL Entry Draft from Harvard University.  He spent two seasons with their American Hockey League affiliate the Hershey Bears but never played in the National Hockey League.  In 2001, he moved to the Austrian Hockey League with EK Zell am See for one season before returning to North America in the ECHL for the Lexington Men O' War and the Louisiana IceGators as well as brief spells for the AHL's Utah Grizzlies and the Houston Aeros.

Storey returned to Europe in 2004 with spells in the German 2nd Bundesliga with the SERC Wild Wings and the Essen Mosquitoes as well as a second spell in Austria with Graz 99ers and EHC Black Wings Linz.  In 2007, Storey signed with British Elite Ice Hockey League team the Newcastle Vipers.  In May 2008, Storey rejected a new contract with the Vipers to remain in North America where he seemingly retired from hockey.

Career statistics

Awards and honors

References

External links

1977 births
Canadian ice hockey defencemen
Colorado Avalanche draft picks
EK Zell am See players
EHC Black Wings Linz players
Essen Mosquitoes players
Graz 99ers players
Harvard Crimson men's ice hockey players
Hershey Bears players
Houston Aeros (1994–2013) players
Ice hockey people from Ottawa
Lexington Men O' War players
Living people
Louisiana IceGators (ECHL) players
Newcastle Vipers players
Schwenninger Wild Wings players
Utah Grizzlies (AHL) players
Canadian expatriate ice hockey players in England
Canadian expatriate ice hockey players in Austria
Canadian expatriate ice hockey players in Germany